Wilhelm Haspel (1898 - 6 January 1952) was a German business executive. He served as the chairman and chief executive officer of Daimler AG from 1942 to 1952.

Early life
Wilhem Haspel was born in 1898. He graduated from the University of Stuttgart.

Career
Haspel joined Daimler in 1924. He became the manager of the factory in Sindelfingen in 1927. He served as the chairman and chief executive officer from 1942 to 1952.

Personal life and death
Haspel was married to a Jewish woman. He died of brain hemorrhage on 6 January 1952 in Stuttgart, Germany.

References

1898 births
1952 deaths
University of Stuttgart alumni
German chief executives
Businesspeople from Stuttgart